Qaem 100 (also Ghaem 100, from a word meaning "upright") is an Iranian expendable, small-lift, space launch vehicle in development by the Islamic Revolutionary Guard Corps (IRGC). It was unveiled on 5 November 2022 and is the first rocket of the Qaem family. According to the IRGC, Qaem 110 will be utilized to launch the Nahid telecommunication satellite.

Development history 

In 2020, the Islamic Revolutionary Guard Corps successfully launched its first rocket, the Qased. Experience acquired through the Qased's development allowed the IRGC to develop the Qaem 100. Its first suborbital test flight has been successfully carried out on 5 November 2022. The IRGC then announced Qaem 100 will "soon" be used to launch the Nahid satellite manufactured by the Ministry of Information and Communications Technology of Iran. The Qaem 100 is planned to be followed by other Qaem rockets including the Qaem 105, Qaem 110 and Qaem 200, which will ultimately allow Iran to put satellites into the 36,000 km GEO orbit.

Design 
Qaem 100 is the first three-stage solid-fueled rocket manufactured by Iran. It will be able to put a satellite weighing  into a  LEO. This is twice the payload that the Qased rocket can lift while the two rockets weigh the same.

The first stage is the Rafe motor that successfully passed its static ground test in January 2022. Rafe is able to produce  of thrust. It uses gimballed thrust vector control (TVC) for steering and has a wound carbon-fiber composite casing reducing weight compared to traditional casing.

Launch history

See also 

 IRGC Aerospace Force
 Iranian Space Agency
 Science and technology in Iran

Other Iranian satellite launch vehicles

 Safir (rocket)
 Simorgh (rocket)
 Qased (rocket)
 Zuljanah (rocket)

References 

Space launch vehicles of Iran
Microsatellite launch vehicles
2022 in Iran
Vehicles introduced in 2022
Solid-fuel rockets